FEU Institute of Technology, also referred to as FEU Tech, is a private, non-sectarian, coeducational higher education institution in Sampaloc, Manila, Philippines. It offers courses in the fields of Engineering and Computer Studies. Established in 1992 as East Asia Computer Center, Inc.(EACCI), an educational partnership of Asia Pacific Computer Technology Center, Intelligent Wave Inc., and Far Eastern University.

FEU Tech is an Institute of Technology. It is cited by the Commission on Higher Education as a Center of Development in IT Education (CoD).

FEU Tech operates under the aegis of the Far Eastern University; it follows and is directly connected to the University. It is headed by Dr. Michael M. Alba as President and Dr. Benson T. Tan as Senior Executive Director.

Like its sister schools, FEU Diliman and FEU Alabang, the college runs on a trimester academic system. An academic year starts in the second week of August and ends every June.

History
In 1936, the Institute of Technology was created in response to the increasing demand for trained engineers and technologists. It offered courses in architecture,  engineering, and chemistry. Subsequently, after the Institute found itself squeezed between the government's cap on tuition fee increase and the rising costs of providing quality education in engineering, the administration decided to phase it out in favor of computer technology programs and had the Institute of Technology closed in 1996.

In July 1991, IBM Philippines together with SM Foundation, Inc. founded Asia Pacific Computer Technology Center (APCTC) in an effort to address the manpower needs of the growing Information Technology industry. APCTC later collaborated with the Far Eastern University (FEU) and Intelligent Wave, Inc. to set up a computer school, which was called East Asia Computer Center, Inc. (EACCI) Later, it was eventually renamed as East Asia Institute of Computer Technology.

On September 30, 1998, the Commission on Higher Education (CHED) noted the change of its name to East Asia College of Information Technology (EACIT).

On February 24, 2000, EACIT was identified by CHED as a Center of Development for Excellence in Information Technology Education.

In 2001, EACIT sought the approval of CHED to offer additional courses leading to Bachelor of Science in Information Technology and Bachelor of Science in Information Management. In the same year, FEU reopened its College of Engineering offering a trimestral (four years and one term) program. Full recognition of the programs were approved in 2004.

FEU bought out the shares of all incorporators and became the sole owner of EACIT in 2002. The following year, the College of Engineering was merged with EACIT and the two formed a technology education powerhouse known as FEU – East Asia College (FEU - EAC).

In 2014, FEU - East Asia College was re-named back to FEU Institute of Technology.

Degree programs
FEU Tech has four programs with Level II accreditations from PAASCU: BS Computer Science with specialization in Software Engineering, BS Information Technology with specialization in Web and Mobile Application Development, BS Civil Engineering, and BS Computer Engineering. Five College of Engineering programs are accredited by the Philippine Technological Council -  Accreditation and Certification Board for Engineering & Technology (PTC - ACBET).

College of Computer Studies and Multimedia Arts
 Bachelor of Science in Computer Science
 Specialization in Software Engineering
 Specialization in Data Science
 Bachelor of Multimedia Arts
 Bachelor of Science in Information Technology
 Specialization in Business Analytics
 Specialization in Innovation and Business
 Specialization in Animation and Game Development
 Specialization in Web and Mobile Applications

College of Engineering
 Bachelor of Science in Civil Engineering
 Bachelor of Science in Computer Engineering
 Bachelor of Science in Electrical Engineering
 Bachelor of Science in Electronics Engineering
 Bachelor of Science in Mechanical Engineering

Department of Graduate Studies
 Master of Information Technology

Buildings
FEU Tech occupied three major buildings in the FEU campus. These were the Main Building, Technology Building, and Annex Building (re-named as Admissions Building, Engineering Building, and Education Building respectively).

The current Engineering Building is the site of the former FEU hospital designed by Arch. Felipe Mendoza that was inaugurated on October 22, 1955.

In 2014, FEU Tech transferred to a newly constructed FEU Institute of Technology (FIT) Building, a 17-storey building located at P. Paredes St., a few meters away from the main campus. Main operations and Computer Studies and Multimedia arts classes are based in the FIT Building, and Engineering Program  being held at the Engineering Building along Nicanor Reyes Sr., St.

FIT Building
 E-Library, Library, Swimming Pool, Covered Gym and Basketball Court, Computer Labs, Electronic Labs, Academic Rooms, Chemistry and Physics Rooms.

Engineering Building
 Computer Labs, Electronics Labs, Engineerings labs, Data Center, Academic Rooms, Class Rooms, Foodcourt, Car Park, FEU Innovation Center, FEU bookstore and merch 2.

See also
List of Far Eastern University Alumni

References

External links
 FEU Institute of Technology

Far Eastern University
Education in Sampaloc, Manila
Universities and colleges in Manila
FEU Tech
Educational institutions established in 1992
1992 establishments in the Philippines